This is the discography of German rapper B-Tight.

Studio albums

Extended plays

Mixtapes

With A.i.d.S

Singles 
 2007 Ich bins ("It's me") (samples of K7’s Come Baby Come)
 2007 Der Coolste ("The coolest")
 2008 Sie will mich ("She wants me")

Free tracks and other releases

References

Discographies of German artists
Hip hop discographies